The Rocky Horror Picture Show is the original soundtrack album to the 1975 film The Rocky Horror Picture Show, an adaptation of the musical The Rocky Horror Show that had opened in 1973. The soundtrack was released as an album in 1975 by Ode Records, produced by Richard Hartley.

Release and reception

The album peaked at No. 49 on the Billboard 200 in 1978. It reached No. 12 on the Australian albums chart and No. 11 on the New Zealand albums chart. William Ruhlmann of AllMusic gave the album a retrospective star rating of five stars out of five and described it as the "definitive version of the [Rocky Horror] score". This version of the soundtrack was certified Gold by the RIAA on 23 February 1981.

Following its initial release, the album was not successful, and was deleted everywhere but in Canada.  Marty Scott, co-founder of Jem Records, obtained a licensing agreement from Ode Records owner Lou Adler, which enabled the album to be imported to the United States.  Scott also obtained a production and distribution license from Adler, which resulted in renewed interest in the album.

Omitted songs
The original soundtrack release omits two songs sung in the film: Rocky's "The Sword of Damocles" and the Frank-N-Furter-led "Planet, Schmanet, Janet" (often referred to as "Wise Up, Janet Weiss"). Also omitted was "Once in a While", which was filmed but later cut.

All three songs were restored for the 25th anniversary release of the album (25 Years of Absolute Pleasure) however "Planet, Schmanet, Janet" lacks the final verse ("don't get hot and flustered") and they are in mono and ported directly from the film itself and so include all the sound effects and dialogue that would normally be omitted from a soundtrack album.

In 2011 these three songs were released, as MP3 format only, in their stereo, studio mixes on the download-only release The Rocky Horror Picture Show Complete Soundtrack: Absolute Treasures 2011 Special Edition. The 2011 album was later issued on double red vinyl for the film's 40th anniversary. However, incidental music and cues are not included and "The Sword of Damocles" features Brian Engel in place of Trevor White. The latter is included with Trevor White's vocals as a bonus track for the iTunes edition; this is the same version found on the "25 Years of Absolute Pleasure" release, albeit in stereo and contains the dialogue and sound effects from the film.

Track listing

Original 1975 release

Bonus tracks (1989 CD release)
 "The Time Warp (Remix 1989 Extended Version)"
 "The Time Warp (Music − 1 = Background Track + U Mix)"

25 Years of Absolute Pleasure (2000)

Absolute Treasures: 40th Anniversary Re-Mastered Edition (2015)

Personnel
 Count Ian Blair - electric and acoustic guitars
 Mick Grabham - electric guitar
 Dave Wintour - bass guitar
 B.J. Wilson - drums 
 Phil Kenzie - saxophone
 John Bundrick - keyboards
 Martin Briley, Helen Chappelle, Brian Engel, Barry St. John, Liza Strike, Clare Torry - backing vocals

In popular culture
As announced by video game developer/publisher Activision in a press release on 12 October 2010, "Time Warp", "Sweet Transvestite", and "Hot Patootie – Bless My Soul" were released for the game Guitar Hero: Warriors of Rock as downloadable content on 26 October.

Charts
The album initially charted in the US in 1978; however, in 2010, following the "Rocky Horror Glee Show" episode of Glee, the album re-entered the Billboard 200 at number 55.

Certifications

References

1975 soundtrack albums
Film soundtracks
Glam rock albums
Sanctuary Records albums
Ode Records soundtracks